Chow's lemma, named after Wei-Liang Chow, is one of the foundational results in algebraic geometry. It roughly says that a proper morphism is fairly close to being a projective morphism. More precisely, a version of it states the following:

If  is a scheme that is proper over a noetherian base , then there exists a projective -scheme  and a surjective -morphism  that induces an isomorphism  for some dense open

Proof 
The proof here is a standard one.

Reduction to the case of  irreducible 

We can first reduce to the case where  is irreducible. To start,  is noetherian since it is of finite type over a noetherian base. To see this, define  to be the scheme-theoretic image of the open immersion 

can be covered by finitely many quasi-projective -schemes 

Letting  denote the canonical open immersion, we define , which we claim is an immersion.

Let  and  be the canonical projections.
Set 

 

We will show that  and  satisfy the conclusion of the theorem.

To show  is surjective, we first note that it is proper and therefore closed. As its image contains the dense open set , we see that  must be surjective.

We will do this by showing that  is an immersion. We define the following four families of open subschemes:

As the  cover , the  cover , and we wish to show that the  also cover . We will do this by showing that  for all . Therefore  for all  and the claim is proven.

The upshot is that the  cover , and we can check that  is an immersion by checking that  is an immersion for all . For this, consider the morphism 

Let  be the canonical injection ; we have to show that there is a morphism  so that .

Additional statements 

References

Bibliography

Theorems in algebraic geometry
Zhou, Weiliang